The Ministry of Social Justice and Empowerment is a Government of India ministry. It is responsible for welfare, social justice and empowerment of disadvantaged and marginalised sections of society, including scheduled castes (SC), Other Backward Classes (OBC), LGBT people, the disabled, the elderly, and the victims of drug abuse. It also helps in the enforcement of legislation with regards to these marginalized groups to better enforce anti-discrimination policies.

The Minister of Social Justice and Empowerment holds cabinet rank as a member of the Council of Ministers. The current minister is Virendra Kumar, who is assisted by a Minister of State, Rattan Lal Kataria, Krishan Pal Gujjar and Ramdas Athavale.

History
In the 1985–1986, the former Ministry of Welfare was divided into the Department of Women and Child Development and the Department of Welfare. At the same time, the Scheduled Castes Development Division, Tribal Development Division and the Minorities and Backward Classes Welfare Division of the Ministry of Home Affairs and the Wakf Division of the Ministry of Law left those ministries to form the new Ministry of Welfare.

The Ministry of Welfare adopted the name Ministry of Social Justice and Empowerment in May 1998. In October 1999, the Tribal Development Division left the ministry to become its own ministry, the Ministry of Tribal Affairs. In January 2007, the Minorities Division and the Wakf Unit were moved out of the ministry to form the Ministry of Minority Affairs and the Child Development Division left the ministry to form the Ministry of Women and Child Development. To propagate the ideologies and philosophy of Babu Jagjivan Ram, the 'Babu Jagjivan Ram National Foundation', has been set up by the Ministry.

In 2012, the Union Minister of Social Justice and Empowerment launched Oblindia, an online library for visually impaired college students. At launch, the library included 12,000 books in 10 languages.

Organisation
The ministry has five bureaus, each headed by a Joint Secretary: Scheduled Castes Development Bureau; Backward Classes Bureau Coordination, Media, Administration; Disability Bureau; Social Defense (SD) Bureau; and Project, Research, Evaluation and Monitoring Bureau.

Statutory Bodies
Office of the Chief Commissioner for Persons with Disabilities, New Delhi
National Trust for the Welfare of Persons with Autism, Cerebral Palsy, Mental Retardation and Multiple Disabilities
Rehabilitation Council of India (RCI)
National Institutes 
Ali Yavar Jung National Institute for the Hearing Handicapped, Mumbai (AYJNIHH)
Deendayal Upadhyaya Institute for the Physically Handicapped, New Delhi (formerly Institute for the Physically Handicapped (IPH))
National Institute for Locomotor Disabilities, Kolkata
National Institute of Mentally Handicapped, Secunderabad (NIMH)
National Institute of Visually Handicapped (NIVH), Dehradun
National Institute of Rehabilitation Training and Research, Cuttack (NIRTAR)
National Institute for Empowerment of Persons with Multiple Disabilities (NIEPMD), Chennai
Indian Sign Language Research & Training Centre (ISLRTC)
Public sector undertakings
National Backward Classes Finance and Development Corporation (NBCFDC)
National Handicapped Finance and Development Corporation (NHFDC)
Artificial Limbs Manufacturing Corporation of India (ALIMCO), Kanpur

*Composite Regional Centres for Persons with Disabilities (CRCs)

*Public Private Partnership**Indian Spinal Injury Centre

Legislation
 Maintenance and Welfare of Parents and Senior Citizens Act, 2007

Ministers of Social Justice and Empowerment

List of Ministers of State

See also 
 National Award for the Empowerment of Persons with Disabilities
 Department of Adi Dravidar and Tribal Welfare (Tamil Nadu)
 Department of Backward Classes, Most Backward Classes and Minorities Welfare (Tamil Nadu)
 Department of Social Welfare and Nutritious Meal Programme (Tamil Nadu)
 Reservation in India

References

External links
Official website

 
Social Justice and Empowerment
Reservation in India
Social justice